is a railway station on the Hakodate Main Line in Teine-ku, Sapporo, Hokkaido, Japan, operated by the Hokkaido Railway Company (JR Hokkaido).

Lines
Hoshimi Station is served by the Hakodate Main Line, and is numbered "S10".

Station layout
The station consists of two ground-level opposed side platforms serving two tracks. The station has automated ticket machines and Kitaca card readers (not equipped with regular ticket gates). The station is unattended.

Platforms

Adjacent stations

History
The station opened on 16 March 1995. Hoshi in Japanese means 'star' and mi is 'looking' in English, so Hoshimi means 'Looking at stars'. It was named after the Hoshimi Bridge, which cross the Hoshioki River.

Surrounding area
The station is situated near the municipality border between Sapporo and Otaru. The small port town Zenibako sits on the Otaru side and there are some factories on the border. To the south of the station, National Route 5 runs connecting Sapporo, Zenibako, and Otaru.

  (to Hakodate)
  (to Otaru)
 Teinehoshioki Post Office
 Nippon COMSYS (communications holding), Hokkaido Branch

See also
 List of railway stations in Japan

References

Railway stations in Japan opened in 1995
Railway stations in Sapporo
Teine-ku, Sapporo